"Feeling So Real" is a song by American electronica musician Moby, released on October 17, 1994, as the second single from his third studio album, Everything Is Wrong (1995). The song features the phrases "sound system rocking my....." (the full sample saying "sound system rocking my sieve") and "set it up DJ!" spoken by Kochie Banton, who also appears in Moby's following single, "Everytime You Touch Me". The guest vocalist for the song is Rozz Morehead. It peaked at number 30 on the UK Singles Chart, number nine on the US Billboard Dance Club Play chart, and number one on the Finnish Singles Chart.

Release 
The single's B-side is Moby's take on the Joy Division song "New Dawn Fades". It would later be included on the Joy Division tribute album A Means to an End: The Music of Joy Division, and Moby would go on to perform it live with New Order.

The remix CD contains all the separate parts (vocals, strings, drums, etc.) for "Everytime You Touch Me". Mute Records and Elektra held a competition where one had to use the parts to create a remix "in any style you want" and mail it in on digital audio tape (DAT) by November 18, 1994. The winning remixes were included on later singles.

Critical reception 
Larry Flick from Billboard wrote, "Leave it to the brilliant mind of Moby to build a bridge uniting rave and classical music. Single has a majestic quality–particularly with its vocals, which have a decidedly operatic bend–that is as interesting to the ear as it is to the body." James Masterton said, "Few techno singles seem to be complete these days without a gimmick, hence the remixing competition that accompanies this release." Pan-European magazine Music & Media commented, "In '91, Go his version of the "Twin Peaks" theme, portrayed Moby as the cryptic one in the dance sphere. Now he's as "vulgarly" Euro as everybody else, but still with a wink." An editor, Maria Jimenez, stated, "Injected with virtually every vibe from techno to jungle to pop, Moby's latest single Feeling So Real (Mute) flies high and fast. If it hasn't reached your turntable yet, now is as good a time as any to put it on and allow yourself to be energised by the euphenic tone and electrifying sounds." 

Andy Beevers from Music Week rated the track four out of five. He added, "The high speed Original Mix of Feeling So Real verges on hardcore and may be the least commercial Moby single for a long while. Slower versions broaden its appeal, but it is unlikely to match the last few releases." Tim Jeffery from the RM Dance Update deemed it "another uplifting techno track with vocals from the slightly odd Moby, but does it have to be so fast?" Another editor, James Hamilton, described it as a "mind bogglingly frantic yet stratospherically soaring flyer strictly for speed freaks, with sweet girl cooed 'I'm feeling so real, take me away' repetition and some ragga 'step it up DJ' punctuation".

Music video 
A music video was made to promote the single, directed by Julie Hermelin.

Track listings 

 CD single 
 "Feeling So Real"  – 4:32
 "Feeling So Real"  – 5:59
 "Feeling So Real"  – 5:47
 "New Dawn Fades" – 5:31
 CD single – remixes 
 "Feeling So Real"  – 5:53
 "Feeling So Real"  – 5:01
 "Feeling So Real"  – 6:46
 "Everytime You Touch Me"  – 4:41
 12-inch single 
 "Feeling So Real"  – 5:53
 "Feeling So Real"  – 4:32
 "Feeling So Real"  – 5:01
 "Feeling So Real"  – 5:47
 "Feeling So Real"  – 5:59
 Cassette single 
 "Feeling So Real"  – 3:22
 "New Dawn Fades" – 5:31

 CD single 
 "Feeling So Real"  – 3:10
 "Feeling So Real"  – 5:59
 "Feeling So Real"  – 5:47
 "Feeling So Real"  – 5:33
 "Feeling So Real"  – 6:46
 "New Dawn Fades" – 5:31
 "Feeling So Real"  – 4:32
 "Feeling So Real"  – 5:01
 "Everytime You Touch Me"  – 4:41
 12-inch single 
 "Feeling So Real"  – 5:47
 "Feeling So Real"  – 5:59
 "Feeling So Real"  – 6:46
 "Feeling So Real"  – 5:33
 "Everytime You Touch Me"  – 4:41

Charts

Weekly charts

Year-end charts

References

External links 
 

1994 singles
1994 songs
Elektra Records singles
Moby songs
Mute Records singles
Number-one singles in Finland
Songs written by Moby